Next Summer is a 1985 French drama film directed by Nadine Trintignant.

Cast
 Philippe Noiret - Edouard
 Claudia Cardinale - Jeanne
 Fanny Ardant - Dina
 Jean-Louis Trintignant - Paul
 Marie Trintignant - Sidonie
 Jérôme Anger - Jude
 Pierre-Loup Rajot - Farou
 Hubert Deschamps - The neighbor
 Christian Marquand - Pierre
 Riton Liebman - Manuel
 Serge Marquand - Professor
 Benoît Régent - Doctor
 Judith Godrèche - Nickie
 Isabelle Mergault - Isabelle

References

External links
 

1985 drama films
1985 films
French drama films
Films about dysfunctional families
1980s French films